Pochytoides is a genus of African jumping spiders that was first described by Wanda Wesołowska in 2020.

Taxonomy
The group was first described by Berland and Millot in 1941 as a subgenus of the genus Pochyta. It was elevated to a full genus by Wanda Wesołowska in 2018. However, neither name was valid as no type species had been given. Wesołowska corrected this in 2020, designating Pochyta poissoni.

Like Pochyta, Pochytoides is placed in the tribe Aelurillini in the Salticoida clade of the subfamily Salticinae.

Species
 the genus contained eleven species. All species are known from Guinea and/or Ivory Coast:
Pochytoides lamottei (Wesołowska, 2018)
Pochytoides mirabilis Wesołowska & Russell-Smith, 2022
Pochytoides monticola (Wesołowska, 2018)
Pochytoides obstipa (Wesołowska, 2018)
Pochytoides patellaris (Wesołowska, 2018)
Pochytoides perezi (Berland & Millot, 1941)
Pochytoides poissoni (Berland & Millot, 1941)
Pochytoides securis (Wesołowska, 2018)
Pochytoides spinigera (Wesołowska, 2018)
Pochytoides tonkoui Wesołowska & Russell-Smith, 2022
Pochytoides tournieri Wesołowska & Russell-Smith, 2022

References

Salticidae
Salticidae genera